is a district located in Ishikawa Prefecture, Japan.

As of April 1, 2005 population data, the district has an estimated population of 18,952 and a density of 212 persons per km2. The total area is 89.36 km2.

Towns and villages
The district has one town:

 Nakanoto

History

Recent mergers
 On October 1, 2004 - The towns of Nakajima, Tatsuruhama and Notojima were merged into the expanded city of Nanao.
 On March 1, 2005 - The towns of Kashima, Toriya and Rokusei merged, forming the town of Nakanoto.

Districts in Ishikawa Prefecture